Qeshlaq-e Owch Quyi Hajj Hasan Shayiqi (also Romanized as Qeshlāq-e Owch Qūyī Ḩājj Ḩasan Shāyīqī) is a village in Qeshlaq-e Sharqi Rural District, Qeshlaq Dasht District, Bileh Savar County, Ardabil Province, Iran. At the 2006 census, its population was 117, in 22 families.

References 

Towns and villages in Bileh Savar County